The Best of Long John Baldry is a compilation album by Long John Baldry released in late 1982. It collects LJB's best work with EMI Capitol. The album features a new track in Percy Mayfield's 'River's Invitation'.

Track listing

"Baldry's Out" – 4:26 (from Baldry's Out!, recorded in 1979)
"Rock With The Best'" – 3:36 (from Rock With the Best, recorded in 1981)
"Something You Got" – 2:53 (from Long John Baldry, recorded in 1980)
"Come And Get Your Love" – 4:29 (from Baldry's Out!, recorded in 1979)
"You've Lost That Loving Feeling" – 3:59 (from Baldry's Out!, recorded in 1979)
"Savoir Faire" – 3:22 (from Long John Baldry, recorded in 1980)
"Love Me Two Times" – 2:41 (from Long John Baldry, recorded in 1980)
"Stay The Way You Are" – 3:27 (from Rock With the Best, recorded in 1981)
"Too Late For Crying" – 3:34 (from Rock With the Best, recorded in 1981)
"River's Invitation" – 3:42 (previously unreleased, recorded in 1980)
"A Thrill's A Thrill" – 5:23 (from Baldry's Out!, recorded in 1979)

1982 compilation albums
Long John Baldry albums